Rumburk is a town in Děčín District in the Ústí nad Labem Region of the Czech Republic. It has about 11,000 inhabitants. It lies on the border with Germany.

Administrative parts

Rumburk is made up of town parts of Rumburk 1, Rumburk 2-Horní Jindřichov and Rumburk 3-Dolní Křečany.

Geography
It lies in the salient region of Šluknov Hook, on the border with Germany. It is situated in the Lusatian Highlands. The Mandau river flows through the town.

History
The first written mention of Rumburk is from 1298. In 1377 it is already referred to as a town. In 1566, a Renaissance castle replaced an old keep and Rumburk became the centre of the Tolštejn manor.

Between 1713 and 1764, English merchants settled here and foreign capital has contributed to long-term development of the town. In 1869, the railroad was built.

Rumburk was the scene of the Rumburk rebellion in May 1918. Until 1918, Rumburg was part of the Austrian monarchy (Austria side after the compromise of 1867), in the district of the same name, one of the 94 Bezirkshauptmannschaften in Bohemia.

In 1938, it was occupied by the Nazi army as one of the municipalities in Sudetenland. The German-speaking population was expelled in 1945 and replaced by Czech settlers, using the adapted name Rumburk.

Demographics

Economy
Following a number of years of depression after the fall of communism, the region is now poised to become an industrial centre again. Rumburk's economy receives a boost thanks to the presence of automotive industry within its borders.

Transport
Rumburk has a road border crossing with the German town of Seifhennersdorf.

The town is the starting point of the regional railway line to Kolín and two local lines to Děčín.

Sights

Rumburk has historical centre with many valuable houses. In the town there are also important monuments of folk architecture – half-timbered houses. The area with 18 half-timbered houses is protected by law as a village monument reservation.

The main landmark is the baroque Loreta chapel. It was built by plans of Johann Lukas von Hildebrandt in 1704–1707. It is surrounded by a cloister with a rich ceiling painting from the life of the Virgin Mary, four chapels and a restored Chapel of the Holy Steps (built in 1768–1770). Loreta in Rumburk was an important Marian pilgrimage site for the region of northern Bohemia and Upper Lusatia.

The former Capuchin monastery and its Church of Saint Lawrence were built in 1683–1685. The monastery was abolished in 1950. The valuable building now serves as a library. The church still serves cultural and religious purposes.

The original wooden Church of Saint Bartholomew was built in the late 12th or early 13th century, the oldest written mention dates from 1352. The building was severely damaged by fires in 1515, 1624 and 1744. Its current appearance is from the reconstruction in 1755.

Notable people
Johann Nepomuk Fischer (1777–1847), Austrian ophthalmologist
Josef Emanuel Fischer von Röslerstamm (1787–1866), Austrian entomologist
Franz Xaver Chwatal (1808–1879), pianist, composer and music teacher
Viktor Tietz (1859–1937), German chess player
Rudolf Pitschak (1902–1988), Czech-German chess master
Helmut Baierl (1926–2005), German playwright and vice president of the DDR Academy of Arts
Jaroslav Falta (1951–2022), motocross racer

References

External links

Cities and towns in the Czech Republic
Populated places in Děčín District
Czech Republic–Germany border crossings